Togo had one athlete compete at the 1992 Summer Olympics in Barcelona, Spain. Six competitors, all men, took part in five events in two sports.

Competitors
The following is the list of number of competitors in the Games.

Athletics

Men
Track & road events

Cycling

Two cyclists represented Togo in 1992.

Road

References

External links
Official Olympic Reports

Nations at the 1992 Summer Olympics
1992
Summer Olympics